"Töntarna" is a song by the Swedish alternative rock band Kent. It was released as the lead single from their eighth studio album Röd on 5 October 2009 as digital download. Two additional remixes by Punks Jump Up and Familjen were released on Kent's digital download store at their website on 9 October 2009, while the CD single was released on 12 October 2009.

Track listing

Credits and personnel
Produced by Kent/Joshua. Recorded in Meistersaal, Berlin and Park Studio/Psykbunkern, Stockholm.
Remix and additional production on track 2 by Punks Jump Up and on track 3 by Familjen.
Lyrics by Berg.
Music by Berg/Sköld.
Mastered by Henrik Jonsson, Masters of Audio.
Design: Helen Svensson & Thomas Ökvist.
Photo: Thomas Ökvist.

Charts

References

External links
Töntarna at Discogs

Kent (band) songs
2009 singles
Song recordings produced by Joshua (record producer)
Number-one singles in Norway
Number-one singles in Sweden
2009 songs
Songs written by Joakim Berg
Songs written by Martin Sköld